UNIDOC is an XML-based standard to support electronic data interchange (EDI) in business transactions between trading companies. The first idea of such a universal format was published in 2014, its first specification in 2016 in the journal of the Chamber of Commerce and Industry Swabia (Bavaria, Germany). The current specification can be found in the UNIDOC XML Schema Definition.

UNIDOC message types 

Electronic business documents are called message types within UNIDOC files. The respective message type ("document type")
is specified in the header. The names of the message types are based on the six-digit "qualifier" known from the EDIFACT standard.

In version 2.0 fifteen different message types are defined:

 CORINV = correction invoice
 DELFOR = delivery forecast
 DESADV = despatch advice
 IFCSUM = /forwarding and consolidation summary
 IFTMIN = transport order
 INVOIC = invoice and credit note
 INVRPT = inventory report
 ORDCHG = order change
 ORDERS = purchase order
 ORDRSP = order response
 OSTRPT = order state report
 PRICAT = price list and catalogue
 RECADV = receipt advice
 REMADV = remittance advice
 SLSRPT = sales report

History 

The UNIDOC standard was developed in 2016 on the initiative of EDICENTER, which is a member of the European EDI Network (EEDIN). This European EDI Network is establishing a pan-European EDI infrastructure based on "every-to-every-interconnect". The exchange format between the providers is UNIDOC.
UNIDOC has already been implemented as a standard interface by several ERP system providers, e.g. Comporsys, Hirschmann or Line Software.

See also 
 Electronic data interchange
 EDIFACT

References

External links 
 UNECE
 Schema file

Data interchange standards